Sonia de Ignacio-Simo Casas (born January 24, 1971 in Terrassa, Catalonia) is a former female field hockey player from Spain, who represented her native country twice at the Olympic Games: 1996 and 2000. She played club hockey for CD Terrassa in Catalunya.

References
sports-reference

External links
 

1971 births
Living people
Field hockey players from Catalonia
Spanish female field hockey players
Olympic field hockey players of Spain
Field hockey players at the 1996 Summer Olympics
Field hockey players at the 2000 Summer Olympics
Sportspeople from Terrassa